The Sunday Chronicle was a newspaper in the United Kingdom, published from 1885 to 1955.

The newspaper was founded in Manchester by Edward Hulton in August 1885.  He was known for his sporting coverage, already publishing the Sporting Chronicle, the Daily Dispatch and the Athletic News. The paper initially cost one penny and, despite its name, was published on both Saturdays and Sundays. The socialist Robert Blatchford worked for the paper in its early years and, owing to his influence, it supported the Manningham Mills strikers. However, Blatchford was sacked immediately after the strike and instead founded the Clarion with the paper's drama critic, Alexander M. Thompson.

Hulton's son, also Edward Hulton, took over the business on his father's death, but sold it to Allied Newspapers in 1923 for £6 million. Publication was moved to London, and James Drawbell was appointed editor, positioning it as a middle market newspaper and increasing circulation.

In 1955 the Chronicle was merged into the Empire News. The Empire News itself disappeared in 1960 when it was merged with the News of the World.

Editors
Thomas Harris
A. W. Woodbridge
1925: James Drawbell
1946:
1950: Gordon McKenzie
1952: John William Robertson
1954: Anthony George Berry
1954: Eugene Romer Wason
1957: George Grafton Green

References

Defunct newspapers published in the United Kingdom
Newspapers published in Manchester
Publications established in 1885
Publications disestablished in 1955
1885 establishments in the United Kingdom
1955 disestablishments in the United Kingdom